The men's  100 metre freestyle event at the 2001 World Aquatics Championships took place 27 July. The heats and semi-finals  were held on 26 July.

Results

Heats

Semi-finals

Final

References
Results from swimrankings.net retrieved 2012-08-13

Semifinals

Swimming at the 2001 World Aquatics Championships